The Rutt Branch of the West Fork of the Middle Nodaway River is a stream in Adair County, Iowa.

In the Adair County plat book, Rutt Branch is erroneously spelled "Ruit" Branch.  It flows mainly through the northeastern part of Jackson township and northwestern part of Summerset township, as well as into Prussia township.

See also
List of rivers of Iowa

References

Bodies of water of Adair County, Iowa
Rivers of Iowa